Kiss & Tell, titled Kiss and Tell on its theatrical release poster, is a 1997 American film directed by Jordan Alan. It was made largely through improvisation.

Plot
Justine Bateman plays Molly, a performance artist who is found dead. Police detectives interview her friends (played by Heather Graham and others) to learn  who killed her and why.

Cast
 Justine Bateman as Molly McMannis
 Richmond Arquette as Detective Bob Starr
 Lewis Arquette as Inspector Dan Furbal
 Peter Greene as Detective John Finnigan
 Jill Hennessy as Interrogator Angela Pierce
 Robert Cait as Dr. Goldwin, The Pathologist 
 Assumpta Serna as Dr. Monica DeBirdy
 Teresa Hill as Ivy Roberts
 Heather Graham as Susan Pretsel
 Rose McGowan as Jasmine Hoyle
 Maria Cina as Cynthia Tie 
 Pamela Gidley as Beta Carotene
 Alexis Arquette as Amerod Burkowitz 
 Nina Siemaszko as Shelly
 Traci Lind as Molly's Roommate
 Brian Avery as Brian Humphries, The Producer 
 Scott Cleverdon as Scott DeBirdy 
 David Arquette as Skippy, The Forensic Man
 Roxana Zal as Sissy, The Forensic Woman
 Lukas Haas as Don, The Forensic Intern
 Billy Devlin as Liam McMannis 
 Christa Miller as Alex Stoddard
 Alexandra Paul as Bambi, The Manicurist
 Mariah O'Brien as Emma, The Sketch Artist

Production
Kiss & Tell was made largely through improvisation over the course of a year, on and off, on 16mm film.

Reception
The film received mixed reviews.  Merle Bertrand of Film Threat called the film "a mess", "confusing" and "not funny".  According to the Hollywood Reporter the film was instead "a candidate for eventual cult status".   Kevin Thomas of the Los Angeles Times gave a mixed review, stating that Alan "demonstrates his capability in handling a large cast that is by and large improvising" but that the movie "looks and sounds better than it is".

References

External links

 Kiss & Tell (official site)

1997 films
Films directed by Jordan Alan
Films shot in 16 mm film
1990s English-language films
American comedy-drama films
1990s American films